Leslie Sebastian Charles,  (born 21 January 1950), better known by his stage name Billy Ocean, is a British recording artist who had a string of R&B international pop hits in the 1970s and 1980s. He was the most popular British R&B singer-songwriter of the early to mid-1980s. After scoring his first four UK top 20 singles including two No. 2 hits in 1976 and 1977, seven years passed before he accumulated a series of transatlantic successes, including three US number ones. In 1985, Ocean won the Grammy Award for Best Male R&B Vocal Performance for his worldwide hit "Caribbean Queen (No More Love on the Run)" and in 1987 was nominated for the Brit Award for Best British Male Artist. His 1986 hit "There'll Be Sad Songs (To Make You Cry)" also reached No. 1 in the US.

In 2002, the University of Westminster, London, awarded Ocean an honorary doctorate of music. In 2010, Ocean was presented with the Lifetime Achievement Award at the MOBO Awards. On 29 July 2011, Ocean became a Companion of the Liverpool Institute for Performing Arts, presented to him by Sir Paul McCartney. He is a member of the Rastafari movement.

Early life and stardom
Ocean was born on 21 January 1950 in Fyzabad, Trinidad and Tobago, to Hainsley Charles, a Grenadian musician, and his wife Violet. He moved to Romford, England, when he was ten years old, just before Trinidad and Tobago became independent in 1962. He was exposed to music at an early age. During his teenage years, he sang regularly in London clubs while also working as a tailor in London's Savile Row. He was discovered by his first manager, John Morphew, who recorded a double A-side single at Pye Studios in London with a full orchestra. However, the ballad singing style of Ocean was going out of fashion and Morphew was unable to get any major label to release it. It remains unreleased. Ocean's father — who had countersigned the management contract as Ocean was underage — asked Morphew to release him from the recording contract, which he did without penalty. In 1969, he joined a local band, the Shades of Midnight, playing in the Shoreditch area of London. He recorded his first single, "Nashville Rain", backed with "Sun in the Morning" in 1971 for Spark Records as Les Charles, and for two years fronted a studio band called Scorched Earth, with whom he released "On the Run" backed with "Let's Put Our Emotions in Motion" in 1974.

In an interview with Myf Warhurst on ABC Radio Melbourne, Ocean stated that the story of him having taken his stage name from the local "Ocean Estate", Stepney in London's East End, where he was living at the time, was in fact not correct. According to the interview, the name was derived from a local football team that was in his home town in Trinidad and Tobago, who called themselves "Oceans 11". In 1976, he recorded his debut studio album, Billy Ocean, with its first single release, "Love Really Hurts Without You", charting at No. 2 in the UK Singles Chart and No. 22 in the US Billboard Hot 100. He enjoyed club success from the songs "Are You Ready" and "Stay the Night" from his second studio album City Limit — both of which were later covered by La Toya Jackson. More successes ensued, including "L.O.D. (Love on Delivery)". He also wrote and composed songs for other artists. In 1981, he scored the US R&B chart with "Nights (Feel Like Getting Down)."

International success

Between 1976 and 1982, Ocean released four studio albums (Billy Ocean, City Limit, Nights (Feel Like Getting Down) and Inner Feelings) through his record label GTO, none of which scored success on any musical charts, aside from his biggest single up to that point, 1976's "Love Really Hurts Without You", which was a top 40 and a top 10 hit in both the UK (No. 2) and the US (No. 22).

As Sony Music acquired GTO Records in 1978, Ocean was shifted to Jive from Epic, in which he received a second breakthrough in his career in the early 1980s. Late 1984 saw the release of his fifth studio album Suddenly and its main single, "Caribbean Queen (No More Love on the Run)" becoming successes on the charts. "Caribbean Queen" became Ocean's first number one single on both the US Billboard Hot 100 and Hot Black Singles charts in late 1984, and the album debuted in the top ten, peaking at No. 9 on both the US Billboard 200 and the UK Albums Chart simultaneously in the US and UK. Suddenly reached gold in the UK, and was certified double platinum by the Recording Industry Association of America (RIAA). He also recorded with Scott Walker in 1984, singing  harmony vocals on "Track Three" from Walker's eleventh studio album Climate of Hunter.

“Caribbean Queen” scored Ocean two Grammy Award nominations, and won the Grammy Award for Best Male R&B Vocal Performance at the 1985 Grammy Awards. Ocean was later presented his award by Jeffrey Daniel of vocal group Shalamar on 620 Soul Train, a UK incarnation of the American music dance show Soul Train. The album's title track also became a success, peaking at No. 4 in both the US and the UK and the song "Loverboy", while also being a No. 2 US success in 1985 was also featured in the first scene of the popular UK BBC One TV series Casualty, in 1986. Ocean appeared at Live Aid in 1985, singing "Caribbean Queen" and "Loverboy", from JFK Stadium in Philadelphia.

His sixth studio album Love Zone (1986) also sold well. It included the successful singles "When the Going Gets Tough, the Tough Get Going", the theme from the film The Jewel of the Nile (1985); this was a No. 1 success in the UK and a No. 2 in the United States; and "There'll Be Sad Songs (To Make You Cry)" (a US No. 1, and also a major UK success). Also included were the title track and "Love Is Forever", which were No. 10 and No. 16 US successes for Ocean, respectively. It also earned Ocean a second nomination for Best Male R&B Vocal Performance at the 1987 Grammy Awards.

In February 1986, Ocean's video for "When the Going Gets Tough, the Tough Get Going" was banned by the BBC, owing to such non-union members as the American actors Michael Douglas, Kathleen Turner and Danny DeVito, all three of whom were cast members of Romancing the Stone (1984) and The Jewel of the Nile (1985), miming to the backing vocals. At the 1987 Brit Awards, Ocean was nominated for the Brit Award for Best British Male.

Ocean's next studio album, Tear Down These Walls (1988), featured another No. 1 single, "Get Outta My Dreams, Get into My Car", while the album was certified platinum.

Later career
Ocean's eighth studio album Time to Move On (1993) failed to produce any major successes, but his 1989 Greatest Hits collection has been a steady seller over the years, and his 1997 compilation album L.I.F.E. – Love Is for Ever made No. 7 on the UK Albums Chart. Ocean's last studio album for Jive Records was Time to Move On, which he recorded in Chicago with R&B star R. Kelly. 

In 2002, the University of Westminster in London awarded Ocean an honorary doctorate of music. The awards ceremony took place in the Barbican Centre, in London. He continues to tour and record in Europe. Ocean is now a patron for Tech Music Schools in London, made up of Drumtech, Vocaltech, Guitar-X and Keyboardtech. He regularly visits to hold clinics and seminars for the students.

In 2004, "Caribbean Queen" was re-released as a digital single for its 20th anniversary, shooting up to No. 25 on the Billboard digital singles chart and garnering radio play across the United States and UK. A remix of the single by will.i.am was released in 2005.

In February and March 2008 he toured Australia and the Far East. His ninth studio album Because I Love You was released on 2 February 2009.

In April 2010, an 18-track compilation album was released in the UK by Sony Music titled The Very Best of Billy Ocean to tie in with a 30-date tour of the UK and Ireland. Featuring Ocean's biggest hits, the album debuted in the UK Albums Chart at No. 17.

 In October 2007, Ocean commenced his first UK tour in more than 15 years.
On 20 October 2010, Ocean was presented with the Lifetime Achievement Award at the MOBO Awards in London. On 29 July 2011, Ocean became a Companion of the Liverpool Institute for Performing Arts. His title was presented by former Beatle Paul McCartney.

In 2012, Ocean made a cameo appearance in the British comedy movie Keith Lemon: The Film as Lemon's father. In January 2016, Ocean appeared on The Tonight Show with Jimmy Fallon to perform some of his classic hits as part of a promo tour for his new album. Ocean toured the UK during March and April 2017.

Ocean recorded a new studio album in mid-2019 at Eve Studios in Stockport, working again with producer Barry Eastmond as co-writer. The album, One World, was to be released on 17 April 2020. After a delay, it was later released 4 September 2020.

Personal life
Ocean has lived in Sunningdale, Berkshire, England, with his wife Judy, since 1978. They have three children. His son played rugby sevens at the 2014 Commonwealth Games for Barbados.

Ocean decided to become vegetarian after the loss of his mother in 1989, who died from ovarian cancer.

Honours
Ocean was appointed Member of the Order of the British Empire (MBE) in the 2020 New Year Honours for services to music.

Awards and nominations

ASCAP Pop Music Awards

!Ref.
|-
| rowspan=3|1986
| rowspan=1|"Caribbean Queen"
| rowspan=7|Most Performed Songs
| 
| rowspan=3|
|-
| "Loverboy"
| 
|-
| "Suddenly"
| 
|-
| rowspan=2|1987
| "There'll Be Sad Songs (To Make You Cry)"
| 
| rowspan=2|
|-
| "When the Going Gets Tough, the Tough Get Going"
| 
|-
| 1988
| "Love Is Forever"
| 
| 
|-
| 1989
| "Get Outta My Dreams, Get into My Car"
| 
|

Billboard Music Awards

!Ref.
|-
| rowspan=6|1985
| rowspan=3|Himself
| Top R&B Singles Artist
| 
|rowspan=6|
|-
| Top R&B Album Artist
| 
|-
| Top Adult Contemporary Artist 
| 
|-
| Suddenly
| Top R&B Album
| 
|-
|rowspan=2|"Suddenly"
| Top R&B Song
| 
|-
| Top Adult Contemporary Single 
| 
|-
| rowspan=18|1986
| rowspan=9|Himself
| Top Artist
| 
|rowspan=18|
|-
| Top R&B Artist
| 
|-
| Top R&B Singles Artist
| 
|-
| Top R&B Album Artist
| 
|-
| Top Billboard 200 Artist
| 
|-
| Top Billboard 200 Artist – Male
| 
|-
| Top Hot 100 Artist
| 
|-
| Top Hot 100 Artist – Male
| 
|-
| Top Adult Contemporary Artist 
| 
|-
| Love Zone
| Top R&B Album
| 
|-
| rowspan=3|"There'll Be Sad Songs (To Make You Cry)"
| Top Hot 100 Song
| 
|-
| Top R&B Song
| 
|-
| Top Adult Contemporary Single
| 
|-
| rowspan=3|"When the Going Gets Tough"
| Top Hot 100 Song
| 
|-
| Top R&B Song
| 
|-
| Top Adult Contemporary Single
| 
|-
| rowspan=2|"Love Zone"
| Top R&B Song
| 
|-
| Top Adult Contemporary Single
|

Grammy Awards
Billy Ocean has been nominated three times for a Grammy Award, with one win.

|-
|rowspan="2"| 1985
|rowspan="2"| "Caribbean Queen (No More Love on the Run)"
| Best Male R&B Vocal Performance
| 
|-
| Best R&B Song (shared with Keith Diamond)
| 
|-
|| 1987
| Love Zone
| Best Male R&B Vocal Performance
| 
|}

Ivor Novello Awards

|-
| 1985
| "Caribbean Queen (No More Love on the Run)"
| rowspan=2|International Hit of the Year 
| 
|-
| rowspan=2|1989
| rowspan=2|"Get Outta My Dreams, Get into My Car"
| 
|-
| Most Performed Work
| 
|-
|2018
| Himself
| International Achievement 
|

Pollstar Concert Industry Awards

!Ref.
|-
| 1985
| Himself
| Comeback of the Year
| 
|

Soul Train Music Awards

|-
| 1987
| Love Zone
| Album of the Year – Male
|

Discography

Studio albums
Billy Ocean (1976)
City Limit (1980)
Nights (Feel Like Getting Down) (1981)
Inner Feelings (1982)
Suddenly (1984)
Love Zone (1986)
Tear Down These Walls (1988)
Time to Move On (1993)
Because I Love You (2009)
Here You Are (2013)
One World (2020)

See also
Lists of UK Singles Chart number ones
List of Billboard number-one singles
List of artists who reached number one in the United States
List of Billboard number-one dance club songs
List of artists who reached number one on the U.S. Dance Club Songs chart
List of Eastern Caribbean people

References

External links

Billy Ocean official website

1950 births
Living people
English soul singers
English dance musicians
English male singer-songwriters
20th-century Trinidad and Tobago male singers
20th-century Trinidad and Tobago singers
21st-century Trinidad and Tobago male singers
21st-century Trinidad and Tobago singers
Grammy Award winners
20th-century Black British male singers
Epic Records artists
Jive Records artists
Trinidad and Tobago people of Grenadian descent
English Rastafarians
People from Siparia region
People from Romford
People from Sunningdale
Trinidad and Tobago emigrants to the United Kingdom
English people of Grenadian descent
Members of the Order of the British Empire
21st-century Black British male singers